The Mysterious Mystery! is a 1924 short silent comedy film directed by Robert F. McGowan. It was the 33rd Our Gang short subject released.

Plot
Little Adelbert, son of a wealthy family, is kidnapped and held for ransom. The gang, led by Mickey, are quickly on the case. Mistaking Detective Jinks as a "suspeck," the gang captures him and notifies the police, who recognize the detective and release him.

One of the kidnappers gives the gang a dollar to deliver a package to Mr. Wallingford: A ransom note attached to a pigeon. The note tells the Wallingfords to attach five $1,000 bills to the pigeon, but the kids accidentally let the pigeon escape.  Riding with Mr. Wallingford, the gang goes to an airfield and hides from Det. Jinks in a plane that Mr. Wallingford hires to follow the pigeon. During the flight the pigeon lands on the wing and Joe wing walks to retrieve the bird, but drops it. The pilot tries to rescue Joe, but falls (safely into a body of water), leaving Mickey to fly the plane.

Mickey, along with Joe and Farina, manages to follow the pigeon who returns to the barn where Little Adelbert is being held. With Mr. Wallingford and Det. Jinks following the plane, Mickey crashes into the barn and the kidnappers are pinned underneath the rubble. Mickey handcuffs the crooks as Mr. Wallingford arrives, who tells Det. Jinks to make sure the boys get the cash reward for capturing the kidnappers. As Mr. Wallingford hugs Adelbert, the gang runs away with Det. Jinks in pursuit, waving the reward money at them.

Production notes
The Mysterious Mystery! marks the first appearance of Eugene "Pineapple" Jackson in an Our Gang comedy. Mary Kornman does not appear.

Cast

The Gang
 Joe Cobb – Joe
 Mickey Daniels – Mickey
 Allen Hoskins – Farina
 Eugene Jackson – Snowball
 Andy Samuel – Andy
 Sonny Loy – Sing Joy
 Jackie Condon – Little Adelbert Wallingford

Additional cast
 Charles A. Bachman – Det. Jinks
 Allan Cavan – Adelbert's grandfather
 Dick Gilbert – Henchman
 William Gillespie – Mr. Wallingford
 Sam Lufkin – Henchman
 Charley Young – Butler

References

External links

1924 films
1924 comedy films
American black-and-white films
Films directed by Robert F. McGowan
Hal Roach Studios short films
Our Gang films
American silent short films
1924 short films
1920s American films
Silent American comedy films